Shevon may refer to:

Shevon John-Brown (born 1995), Grenadian footballer
Shevon Jemie Lai (born 1993), Malaysian badminton player
Shevon Nieto (born 1982), former Jamaican hurdler
Shevon Thompson (born 1993), Jamaican professional basketball player